The Bundesstraße 214 (B 214) is a federal road that runs from Lingen to Brunswick in North Germany.

Route 
The B 214 begins on the Lingen Heights, the highest elevation in the Emsland, where it branches off the B 70 and B 213, and runs eastwards in the north of Osnabrück district, where it crosses the Ankum Heights in the North Teutoburg Forest-Wiehengebirge Nature Park. It crosses the A 1 autobahn at the Holdorf exit. The B 214 then continues, crossing the Damme Hills and runs north of the Dümmer lake through numerous boggy (moor) areas. In Nienburg it crosses the River Weser. East of the Leine river B 214 runs parallel to the Aller through the southern part of the Lüneburg Heath. It crosses the A 7 motorway at the Schwarmstedt exit. Behind Celle it changes direction to the southeast and continues on west of the river Oker. In Ohof near Meinersen it runs over the Hanover–Berlin high-speed railway, where there was a level crossing until 1997. Beyond the Wendeburg village of Neubrück it crosses the A 2 motorway and then the Mittelland Canal. Passing through Watenbüttel it finally arrives at Brunswick. It ends there today at Amalienplatz on the central ring road in the town and merges into the B 1.

Districts, towns and villages 
Lower Saxony
Emsland district
Lingen (Ems), Thuine, Freren, Andervenne
Osnabrück district
Fürstenau, Ankum, Bersenbrück, Gehrde, Badbergen
Vechta district
Holdorf, Steinfeld (Oldenburg)
Diepholz district
Diepholz, Wetschen, Rehden, Hemsloh, Barver, Wehrbleck, Sulingen (ring road), Maasen, Borstel
Landkreis Nienburg/Weser
Wietzen, Marklohe, Nienburg/Weser (Ortsumgehung), Steimbke, Rodewald
Soltau-Fallingbostel district
Gilten, Schwarmstedt, Essel, Buchholz (Aller)
Celle district
Wietze, Hambühren, Celle, Wienhausen, Eicklingen, Bröckel (ring road)
Hanover Region
Uetze (Village in Kreuzkrug, part of Eltze)
Gifhorn district
Meinersen (village in Ohof)
Peine district
Edemissen, Wendeburg (part of Neubrück)
Gifhorn district
Schwülper
Brunswick

Rivers crossed 
 Hase, in Bersenbrück
 Hunte, in Diepholz
 Wagenfelder Aue, in Barver
 Weser, in Nienburg
 Leine, in Schwarmstedt
 Wietze, in Wietze
 Fuhse, in Celle shortly before its confluence with the Aller
 Mittelland Canal, in Brunswick north of Watenbüttel

History

Origin 
The metalled, man-made road (Chaussee) between Brunswick and Celle was built from 1804 to 1815 and called Celler Straße.

The westernmost section between Lingen, Fürstenau and Bersenbrück was opened to traffic on 1 July 1856. A regular post coach ran on this road from that day until the opening of the Rheine–Quakenbrück railway on 1 July 1879. From 1925 the section between Freren and Lingen was served by a bus line.

Former routing and names 
Between 1934 and 1938 the road was called the Reichsstraße 214.

The B 214 used to run within Brunswick past its present end at Amalienplatz down Celler Straße and the western arm of the Oker and the Radeklint to the city centre.

Since the Reichsstraße times many of the B 214's former routes through villages and towns have been replaced by ring road section, the last (in 2008) being the bypass around Diepholz. Since the B 214 now crosses the Weser at Nienburg together with the B 6, there is no longer the risk of it being closed due to flooding.

Replacements 
The section between Brunswick and Watenbüttel and the so-called northern ring road in Brunswick around the formerly separate village of Ölper was replaced in the 1980s by the roughly 4 km long A 392 motorway (so-called Nordtangente Braunschweig), which then runs on eastwards to the exit at Hamburger Straße.

The very short A 392 even has a motorway intersection, the Ölper Knoten with the A 391.

Cancelled plans 
The route from Nienburg as far as the crossing with the B 3 near Celle was originally to have been upgraded to form part of the scrapped A 32 autobahn project.

Tourism

Holiday routes 
The German Timber-Frame Road runs along the B 214 between Celle and Brunswick.

Places of interest 
 Castle and historic old town (Altstadt) at Fürstenau
 St. Nicholas' Church (St.Nikolaus-Kirche or Artländer Dom) in Ankum
 Wienhausen Abbey
 Abbay Franziskanerinnen vom hl. Martyrer Georg Thuine
Megalith-Stones Ankum, Freren and Thuine

See also
List of federal roads in Germany

214